Azizjon Ganiev (born 22 February 1998) is an Uzbek football midfielder who plays for Shabab Al-Ahli in UAE Pro League and the Uzbekistan national football team.

Club career
Played for the youth team FC Nasaf Since 2014, he has been involved in the main team. In early December 2016, information appeared about the interest of FC Zenit Saint Petersburg.

International career
Ganiev made his international debut for Uzbekistan on November 14, 2017, during a friendly match against United Arab Emirates.

International

Statistics accurate as of match played 27 January 2022

References

External links
 

1998 births
Living people
Association football midfielders
Uzbekistani footballers
Uzbekistani expatriate footballers
Uzbekistan youth international footballers
Uzbekistan international footballers
FC Nasaf players
Shabab Al-Ahli Club players
Uzbekistan Super League players
UAE Pro League players
Expatriate footballers in the United Arab Emirates
Uzbekistani expatriate sportspeople in the United Arab Emirates